Mathias Seger (born 17 December 1977) is a Swiss former professional ice hockey defenceman who played for the SC Rapperswil-Jona Lakers and the ZSC Lions of the National League (NL). Seger began his professional career with SC Rapperswil-Jona in 1996. He played three seasons with Rapperswil-Jona before joining the Lions in 1999. With the Swiss men's national team he won a silver medal at the 2013 World Championships. Seger also won the 2009 Champions League as well as six National League titles, all with the ZSC Lions. He will be inducted into the IIHF Hall of Fame in 2020.

Playing career
Seger was selected to play for the Switzerland men's national ice hockey team at the 2010 Winter Olympics. He also represented Switzerland at the 1996 and 1997 IIHF World U20 Championship, and the 1998, 1999, 2000, 2001, 2002, 2003, 2004, 2005, 2006, 2008, 2009, 2010, 2011, 2012, 2013 and 2014 Ice Hockey World Championship, and the 2002 and 2006 Winter Olympics.

By playing his 16th World Championship in 2014, Seger set a record for most appearances. On 7 January 2014 Seger was named to Switzerland's official 2014 Winter Olympics roster, marking his fourth Olympic appearance.

On 28 February 2017 Seger agreed to a one-year contract extension with the Lions for a reported worth of CHF 1.5 million.

In the summer of 2017, Seger was stripped of Zurich captaincy for undisclosed reasons. Patrick Geering became the new captain of the team. After winning his sixth Swiss championship title with the ZSC Lions in 2018, he announced the end of his playing career. He played a total of 1167 games in the National League, as well as 327 games with the Swiss national team.

On 4 February 2020 he was announced as an inductee into the player category of the IIHF Hall of Fame. The induction ceremony was scheduled during the 2020 IIHF World Championship, but was delayed due to the COVID-19 pandemic. The IIHF Hall of Fame class of 2020/2022 was inducted during the 2022 IIHF World Championship.

In 2020 he was introduced in to the IIHF All-Time Switzerland Team.

Career statistics

Regular season and playoffs

International

References

External links

Living people
1977 births
Olympic ice hockey players of Switzerland
Swiss ice hockey defencemen
Ice hockey players at the 2002 Winter Olympics
Ice hockey players at the 2006 Winter Olympics
Ice hockey players at the 2010 Winter Olympics
Ice hockey players at the 2014 Winter Olympics
SC Rapperswil-Jona Lakers players
ZSC Lions players
Sportspeople from the canton of St. Gallen